World Wide Fund for Nature-India, better known by its abbreviation WWF-India, has been devotedly working to protect and secure natural heritage and ecology for more than 50 years. It has an autonomous office, with the Secretariat based in New Delhi and various state, divisional and project offices spread across India.

WWF-India is one of India’s leading conservation organizations. Established as a Charitable Trust in 1969, it has massed almost five decades of experience in the field. Having started with modest beginnings, the organisation has come a long way helped by the efforts of its founders and associates who volunteered their efforts to lend momentum to this movement in its initial years.

Programmes
WWF-India today is engaged in many activities for protection and conservation of the environment in the Indian context. Climate change and energy conservation are among the chief areas of concern. The Forest and Biodiversity Conservation Division strives to promote and enhance conservation of forest ecosystems through a participatory approach involving key stakeholders in India. Through its Environment Education Programme and Education for Sustainable Development, it aims at strengthening individual and institutional capacity in nature conservation and environmental protection through widespread education and awareness.

Education for Sustainable Development
WWF-India launched an Education for Sustainable Development program in June 2013, including a trainer kit with materials in six languages, English, Hindi, Assamese, Bengali, Kannada and Malayalam. The program was targeted at teacher training and educational bodies responsible for curriculum.

As a pilot program, the WWF-India had introduced the program several months earlier in thirteen model schools. One of the model schools, Salbari Higher Secondary School, was transformed by the program. Beyond cleaning up their school, the students set up a bird watching club, planted saplings with protective fencing, made a worm-compost pit, and started several other environmental projects.

As of January 2015, the programme was active in four states.

Controversy
The Silence of the Pandas is a documentary on WWF-International, and also focuses on WWF-India and other WWF branches. A year in the making, this film from the award-winning German film maker Wilfried Huismann sought to dispel the green image of the WWF. Behind the WWF's eco-facade, the film uncovered explosive stories from all around the world.

There has also been a criticism of their tiger conservation projects.

See also
 Bombay Natural History Society (BNHS)
 Indian natural history
 Protected areas of India
 Sanctuary Asia
 Wildlife Institute of India (WII)
 Wildlife of India
 Wildlife Trust of India (WTI)
 Zoo Outreach Organisation

References

External links
 Official website of WWF-India

Natural history of India
Animal charities based in India
Wildlife conservation in India
World Wide Fund for Nature
Organizations established in 1969
1969 establishments in Delhi